Tiefeng District is an urban district of the city of Qiqihar, Heilongjiang province, China.

Administrative divisions 
Tiefeng District is divided into 7 subdistricts and 1 town. 
7 subdistricts
 Zhanqian, Nanpu, Tongdong, Guangrong, Longhua, Beijuzhai, Donghu
1 town
 Zhalong

References

External links

Districts of Qiqihar